Mêlée is an American rock band from Orange County in California. Formed in 2000, the band consists of Ricky Sans, Chris Cron, Ryan Malloy and Derek Lee Rock. The group released their debut album Everyday Behavior under Los Angeles-based independent label Subcity Records in 2004. In 2006, they were signed with major record label Warner Bros. Records, and subsequently, in 2007 made their major record label debut Devils & Angels. In 2010, they released their follow up album on Warner titled The Masquerade, released in Japan and digitally in North America.

History

Devils and Angels
The first single, "Built to Last" had international radio success, peaking at No. 8 in Austria; No. 4 in Belgium; No. 75 in Czech Republic; No. 58 in Denmark; No. 6 in Finland; No. 2 in Germany; No. 29 in Ireland; No. 2 in Netherlands; No. 13 in Norway; No. 54 in Sweden; No. 7 in Switzerland; No. 16 in UK; No. 1 in Japan; No. 2 in Indonesia; No. 12 in Thailand.

"Imitation", the follow up single had international radio success as well, reaching No. 21 in Belgium; No. 43 in Switzerland; No. 10 in Singapore; No. 47 in Netherlands.
"Can't Hold On", the third single, charted at No. 97 in Netherlands.

"Biggest Mistake" is featured in the trailer for Disney animated movie, Tangled in 2010. "Stand Up" is featured on the soundtrack for the film Sydney White starring Amanda Bynes 2007. Melee appeared in Where Music Meets Film, a one-hour TV special of the three night live music event at the 2008 Sundance Film Festival, that aired on Fuse in 2008.

The Masquerade
The single "On The Movie Screen" reached No. 3 on The J-Wave Tokio Hot 100 radio chart.

"The Ballad of You and I" was the iTunes Store free single download of the week on October 5, 2010. "The Ballad of You and I" was featured in promotion ads for NBC The Biggest Loser in December 2010.

Members
 Chris Cron (vocals, keyboard, guitar)
 Ricky Sans (guitar, vocals)
 Ryan Malloy (bass, vocals)
 Derek Lee Rock (drums)

Former members
 Mike Nader (drums)
 Israel Villanueva (drums, vocals)
 Michael Amico (drums)
 Lina Simpson (keyboard, vocals)

After breakup
Band member Chris Cron appeared in the auditions of season 11 of the American edition of The Voice singing "Never Tear Us Apart" from INXS, but failed to turn the chair of any of the four judges Adam Levine, Miley Cyrus, Alicia Keys and Blake Shelton. After the performance, he talked about the success of Mêlée internationally, particularly in Japan and his circumstances after the break up of the band.

Discography

Studio albums

Extended Plays (EPs)
2000 – An Existential Guide To Love
2001 – Transmission
2002 – Mêlée
2003 – Against the Tide
2007 – New Heart/Sick — These songs were not on Mêlée's albums but rather released via the US iTunes online store.

Singles

Compilations
OCSka.com Compilation CD (2001) Ocska.comFeaturing "Last Chance"
Rock Your Socks Off! (2001) Mr. Good RecordsFeaturing "Audra"
The Best of Orange County, Volume 1 (2002) Tankfarm RecordsFeaturing "Francesca"
Because We Care: A Benefit for the Children's Hospital of Orange County (2002) Gluefactory RecordsFeaturing "Goodnight For Now"
Hopelessly Devoted to You Vol. 5 (2004) Hopeless Records/Sub CityFeaturing "New Day" and "Francesca"
In Honor: A Compilation To Beat Cancer (2004) Vagrant RecordsFeaturing "The War" (Piano Version)Hopelessly Devoted to You Vol. 6 (2006) Hopeless Records/Sub CityFeaturing "The War" (Alternate Version) and "The War" (Music Video)Gift Wrapped - 20 Songs That Keep on Giving!'' (2009) Warner Bros. RecordsFeaturing "(When Is) Hanukkah This Year"

Notes

References

External links
 Official Twitter
 Interview with Melee

Musical groups from Orange County, California
Pop punk groups from California
Sub City Records artists
Musical groups disestablished in 2012
Musical groups established in 2000